Aluworks is a manufacturing company based in Tema, Greater Accra. It was founded on February 24, 1978 and was converted to a public limited liability company on May 28, 1996. After an Initial Public Offer in October 1996, it was listed on the Ghana Stock Exchange on November 29, 1996 at the share price of GH¢ 0.135. The company is a component listing of the GSE All-Share Index.

Operations
Aluworks is a company that makes aluminium sheets, coils, corrugated roofing, louver blades, etc. from raw aluminium ingots.

One of Aluworks' principal raw materials vendors, the Volta Aluminium Company, was completely closed between May 2003 and early 2006 due to problems in negotiating an electricity supply.

References

External links
 Aluworks Limited Stock Quote
 Aluworks Ltd at Gold Coast Securities
 

Ghanaian brands
Aluminium companies of Ghana
Manufacturing companies established in 1978
1978 establishments in Ghana
Companies listed on the Ghana Stock Exchange